Casino is a Norwegian game show hosted by Hallvard Flatland. It aired on TVNorge running from 1989 to 1996.

Casino on TVNorge
Hallvard Flatland presented the program from 1989 to 1993. Flatland was accompanied by former model , who awarded prizes. Dressing elegantly, smiling, hugging, but never saying anything, she gave rise to the concept "Tause Birgitte" (Silent Birgitte).

Flatland's successor as presenter was Leif Erik Forberg. From 1993 the female hostess varied frequently, picked "from the street". Hostesses included later musician Lene Nystrøm and actress Janne Formoe.

Revival on TV3 Norway
Casino was revived on the channel TV3 Norway, where it aired 2003–2004, and again hosted by Flatland. He was accompanied by hostess Katrine Sørland.

References

Norwegian game shows
Norwegian television series
1989 Norwegian television series debuts
1996 Norwegian television series endings
TVNorge original programming
1980s Norwegian television series
1990s Norwegian television series